William Bruce Mageean Lansbury (12 January 1930 – 13 February 2017) was a British-born Irish-American television producer, television writer and screenwriter. His career spanned over 30 years, from the 1960s to the 1990s, and included work on a number of American television series.

Personal life
Born in London in 1930, Lansbury was the son of Belfast-born actress Moyna Macgill and Edgar Lansbury, a British politician and businessman, and grandson of future Labour Party leader George Lansbury. He was the younger brother of actress Angela Lansbury and the twin brother of theatre, film, and television producer Edgar Lansbury. Both brothers became United States citizens in 1954. Lansbury was a graduate of UCLA and married his first wife, Mary Hassalevris in 1951. The couple had two daughters and remained together until Mary's death in 1996. In 1998, he married Gail England.

Television
Lansbury served as producer of 69 episodes of The Wild Wild West, from 1966 to 1969, and 38 episodes of Mission: Impossible, from 1969 to 1972, and among his work on other television series and TV movies, Lansbury served as producer of Wonder Woman, Knight Rider, Buck Rogers in the 25th Century and executive producer for the science fiction series The Fantastic Journey.

His name appears in the closing credits of The Brady Bunch, Happy Days and The Odd Couple as "Vice President of Creative Affairs" for Paramount Television.

Lansbury's most notable position was serving as producer of 88 episodes of Murder, She Wrote, starring his sister, Angela. He was also a writer for 15 episodes of the show.

Death
Bruce Lansbury died on 13 February 2017, at the age of 87 in La Quinta, California, after battling Alzheimer's disease.

References

External links

1930 births
2017 deaths
American screenwriters
American television producers
English screenwriters
English male screenwriters
English television producers
People with acquired American citizenship
Deaths from Alzheimer's disease
Deaths from dementia in California
Lansbury family
20th-century British businesspeople